is a Japanese manga series written and illustrated by Atto. The series was serialized in Media Factory's Monthly Comic Alive magazine from September 2009 to February 2021 and is licensed in North America by Seven Seas Entertainment. The story is based on the same setting as Atto's former work, Toko-toko & Yume no Yume. A 12-episode anime television series adaptation by Silver Link aired in Japan between October and December 2013 and has been licensed by Sentai Filmworks. A second anime season aired between July and September 2015. An anime film premiered in August 2018, and a third anime season aired between January and March 2021.

Plot
The story takes place in the countryside small town village of Asahigaoka, a place lacking many of the conveniences that people from the city are accustomed to. The nearest stores are a few miles away and one of the local schools consists of only five students, each of whom is in a different grade of elementary or middle school. Hotaru Ichijo, a fifth grader from Tokyo, transfers into Asahigaoka Branch School and adjusts to countryside life with her new friends.

Characters

Main characters

Hotaru is a fifth grade student who transfers into Asahigaoka Branch School from Tokyo due to her father's work transfer. She is quite tall for her age and has a crush on Komari to the point of frequently sewing various plush dolls of Komari to decorate her room with. She had come to Asahigaoka several times previously when she was younger because her relatives live nearby.

Renge is a first grade student. Her catchphrase is "Nyanpasū" (Meow-ning), a nonsensical phrase, and she plays the recorder. While she generally acts her age, she is often quite perceptive and eccentric. She adds a superfluous "n" at the end of sentences as a verbal tic. She is Hikage and Kazuho's younger sister.

Natsumi is a first-year middle school student. She is taller than Komari, her older sister. Rebellious and carefree, she often talks back to her mother, plays pranks on her older sister, and does poorly in school.

Komari is a second-year middle school student and Natsumi's older sister. She is quite short, a fact which she constantly bemoans as Natsumi often teases her for it. She has an innocent and easily scared personality, which Natsumi often takes advantage of.

Supporting characters

Suguru is a third-year middle school student and Natsumi and Komari's older brother. He doesn't speak and has very little presence besides occasional static visual comedy.

Kazuho is Renge's older sister and the only teacher in the local school. She is also a 24-year-old graduate of Asahigaoka Branch School. She is fond of sleeping. Since all the students essentially study on their own in the classroom due to their different grades, she often spends class time napping.

Kaede is a 20-year-old graduate of Asahigaoka Branch School who runs the local candy store. As a result the other characters, and Renge in particular, call her . Her store also runs a ski rental business and mail order service.

Hikage is Renge's older sister who is a first-year high school student studying in Tokyo. She is also a graduate of Asahigaoka Branch School. She also appears in the author's other work . When she returns to the village she tries to impress her siblings and friends with her trendy and "city-girl" ways only to be upstaged by Hotaru's genuine modern knowledge.

Yukiko is Natsumi, Komari, and Suguru's mother. She is often strict, particularly towards Natsumi, who slacks off a lot. She is also a graduate of Asahigaoka Branch School. When she was a student, she took care of Kazuho as Kaede did with Renge when she was younger (according to the author in the afterword).

Konomi is a graduate of Asahigaoka Branch School who lives next door to the Koshigayas. She is a third-year student at a nearby high school.

Honoka is a first grade student who comes to visit her grandmother during summer vacation and becomes friends with Renge. She also appears in the author's other work .

Aoi is a first-year middle schooler who lives in Okinawa and works at her family's inn. A member of her school's badminton club, she quickly befriends Natsumi over their shared age and interest in the sport.

Shiori is the daughter of a police box officer, one year younger than Renge.

Akane is a first-year high school student, a junior of Konomi, and in charge of flute in the brass band club.

Media

Manga
The manga by Atto was serialized in Media Factory's Comic Alive magazine from the November 2009 issue sold on September, 26 2009, to the April 2021 issue sold on February 26, 2021, and ran for 120 chapters. It has been published in 16 tankōbon volumes from June 29, 2015, to March 23, 2021. Seven Seas Entertainment publishes the series in North America. In May 2021, a short spinoff manga titled Non Non Biyori: Remember began serialization.

Anime

A 12-episode anime television series adaptation, produced by Silver Link and directed by Shinya Kawatsura, aired in Japan between October 8 and December 24, 2013, and was simulcast by Crunchyroll. An original video animation (OVA) episode was bundled with the seventh manga volume released on July 23, 2014, and another OVA was bundled with the tenth manga volume on September 23, 2016. A third OVA will be bundled with the complied volume of the Non Non Biyori Remember manga on March 23, 2022. The series is licensed in North America by Sentai Filmworks. 

A second season, Non Non Biyori Repeat, aired in Japan between July 7 and September 22, 2015.

An anime film, titled Non Non Biyori Vacation, premiered on August 25, 2018, with the staff and cast from the anime series returning to reprise their roles.

A third season, Non Non Biyori Nonstop, aired from January 11 to March 29, 2021. The staff and cast from the first two anime series are reprising their roles for the season. The third season ran for 12 episodes.

Reception
As of December 2015, the manga has sold over 1.3 million copies.

References

External links
 Non Non Biyori at Media Factory 
  
 

2009 manga
2013 anime television series debuts
2015 anime television series debuts
2021 anime television series debuts
Comedy anime and manga
Iyashikei anime and manga
Kadokawa Dwango franchises
Media Factory manga
Odex
School life in anime and manga
Seinen manga
Sentai Filmworks
Seven Seas Entertainment titles
Silver Link
TV Tokyo original programming